Dárvin Francisco Chávez Ramírez (born 21 November 1989) is a Mexican former professional footballer who played as a left-back. He is an Olympic gold medalist.

Club career
He started his career at Atlas, starting out playing for their second team, Académicos de Atlas, in the Ascenso MX before making his debut for the first team on 11 October 2008 against Monterrey, in a game that ended 0–0. In total he made 61 Primera appearances for Atlas.
On 4 April 2018, Chávez joined Finnish second tier side FF Jaro on a deal until the end of the 2018 season. On 13 January 2020, Chávez joined Veikkausliiga club SJK Seinäjoki on a one-year deal. He left the club on 13 November 2020.

Honours
Monterrey
CONCACAF Champions League: 2010–11, 2011–12, 2012–13

Veracruz
Copa MX: Clausura 2016

Mexico Youth
Pan American Games: 2011
CONCACAF Olympic Qualifying Championship: 2012
Olympic Gold Medal: 2012

Career statistics
Statistics up to date as of 2012-13

International

Notes

 Continental statistics are for CONCACAF Champions League
 Other statistics in 2008–09 include games played in 2009 InterLiga and 2009 North American SuperLiga; in 2011–12 they relate to 2011 FIFA Club World Cup
 Interliga stats (4/0) have been sourced from the match line-ups at Soccerway: group games and final stage game v Pachuca;North American SuperLiga stats (3/0) are sourced from match line-ups at ESPN

References

External links
 
 Darvin Chavez at ESPN Deportes 
 
 
 

1989 births
Living people
People from Zapopan, Jalisco
Footballers from Jalisco
Association football defenders
Mexico international footballers
Footballers at the 2011 Pan American Games
Pan American Games gold medalists for Mexico
Pan American Games medalists in football
2011 Copa América players
Olympic footballers of Mexico
Footballers at the 2012 Summer Olympics
Olympic gold medalists for Mexico
Olympic medalists in football
Medalists at the 2012 Summer Olympics
2013 CONCACAF Gold Cup players
Atlas F.C. footballers
C.F. Monterrey players
C.D. Veracruz footballers
FF Jaro players
Seinäjoen Jalkapallokerho players
Liga MX players
Ykkönen players
Veikkausliiga players
Mexican expatriate footballers
Mexican expatriate sportspeople in Finland
Expatriate footballers in Finland
Medalists at the 2011 Pan American Games
Mexican footballers